The Ballad of a Small Player is a 2014 novel by British writer Lawrence Osborne. Set in the gambling casinos of Macau, it follows the fortunes of an English con man who passes himself off as a runaway Lord. Part ghost story, part psychological thriller, it earned Osborne comparisons with Graham Greene and Dostoievsky.

The novel was selected for numerous year's best novel lists, including the 100 Notable Books of 2014 in The New York Times, by Neal Mukarjee in New Statesman, and by Ian Crouch in The New Yorker. It was admiringly reviewed by Tom Shone in The New York Times.  China scholar Paul French in the Los Angeles Review of Books wrote: "I'll come right out and say it... Osborne's novel is the best on contemporary China since Malraux's."

An adaptation to the big screen is currently in development with Good Chaos, with Rowan Joffe as screenwriter

References

2014 British novels
Psychological thriller novels
Ghost novels
Novels by Laurence Osborne
Novels set in Macau
Hogarth Press books